Events from the year 1556 in art.

Events

Works

Sofonisba Anguissola – Self-portrait at the easel
Jan Sanders van Hemessen – The Parable of the Unmerciful Servant

Births
August 16 - Bartolomeo Cesi, Italian painter of the Bolognese School (died 1629)
October 24 - Giovanni Battista Caccini, Italian sculptor (died 1613)
date unknown
Giovanni Bizzelli, Italian painter (died 1612)
Aurelio Lomi, Italian painter of frescoes (died 1622)
Carlo Maderno, Italian sculptor (died 1629) 
Alessandro Maganza, Italian Mannerist painter (died 1630)
Pietro Malombra, Italian painter (died 1618)
Lazzaro Tavarone, Genoese painter (died 1641)
probable
Adrien de Vries, late Mannerist sculptor born in the Netherlands (died 1626)
Otto van Veen, painter, draughtsman, and humanist (died 1629)

Deaths
April - Cristofano Gherardi, Italian Mannerist painter (born 1508)
August 1 - Girolamo da Carpi, court painter and decorator to the Duke d'Este (born 1501)
date unknown 
Luca Penni, Italian painter, member of the School of Fontainebleau (born 1500)
Girolamo da Santa Croce, Italian Renaissance painter (born 1480/1485)
probable – Jan Mostaert, Haarlem painter (born 1475)

 
Years of the 16th century in art